Wunderboy is the debut studio album by Finnish sketch comedy and musical trio Justimus. Released on 27 May 2014, the album peaked at number one on the Finnish Albums Chart.

Track listing

Charts

Release history

See also
List of number-one albums of 2014 (Finland)

References

2014 debut albums
Finnish-language albums